The Brahmaputra Valley semi-evergreen forests is a tropical moist broadleaf forest ecoregion of Northeastern India, southern Bhutan and adjacent Bangladesh.

Location and description
The valley lies between the Himalayas to the north and the Lushai hills to the south and when the river floods during the June to September monsoon it brings up to 300 cm of water onto the plain carrying rich soils to create a fertile environment which has been extensively farmed for thousands of years. Other rivers that water the plains as well as the Brahmaputra include the Manas and the Subansiri.

Flora/plants
The extensive farming has meant that the original semi-evergreen forest now exists only in patches. Typical canopy trees include the evergreen Syzygium, Cinnamomum and Magnoliaceae along with deciduous Terminalia myriocarpa, Terminalia citrina, Terminalia tomentosa, Tetrameles species. Understory trees and shrubs include the laurels Phoebe, Machilus, and Actinodaphne, Polyalthias, Aphanamixis, and cultivated Mesua ferrea and species of mahogany, cashews, nutmegs and magnolias, with bamboos such as Bambusa arundinaria and Melocanna bambusoides.

Fauna/animals
Despite the centuries of human clearance and exploitation, the forests and grasslands along the river remain a habitat for a variety of wildlife including tiger (Panthera tigris), clouded leopard (Pardofelis nebulosa), capped langur (Semnopithecus pileatus), gaur (Bos gaurus), barasingha deer (Cervus duvaucelii), sloth bear (Melursus ursinus), wild water buffalo (Bubalus arnee), India's largest population of Asian elephants (Elephas maximus) and the world's largest population of Indian rhinoceros, while Asian black bears live in the higher slopes of the valley sides. Most of these mammals are threatened or endangered species. The Brahmaputra is a natural barrier to the migration of much wildlife and many species, such as the pygmy hog, hispid hare, or the Malayan sun bear, pig-tailed macaque, golden langur, stump-tailed macaque, western hoolock gibbon live on one side of the river only. The area is a meeting point of species of Indian and Malayan origin. The endemic mammals of the valley are the pygmy hog and the hispid hare, both of which inhabit the grasslands of the riverbanks.

The valley is home to rich bird life with 370 species of which two are endemic, the Manipur bush quail (Perdicula manipurensis) and the marsh babbler (Pellorneum palustre) and one, the Bengal florican is very rare. Woodland birds like kalij pheasant, great hornbill, rufous necked hornbill, brown hornbill, Oriental pied hornbill, grey hornbill, peacock pheasant and tragopan are quite common.

Threats and preservation
This area has been densely populated for centuries and most of the valley has been and still are used for agriculture. Some blocks of natural habitat do remain, however, mainly in national parks the largest of which are Manas, Dibru-Saikhowa and Kaziranga National Parks in India. In Bhutan, these areas are part of Royal Manas National Park.

Protected areas
In 1997, the World Wildlife Fund identified twelve protected areas in the ecoregion, with a combined area of approximately 2,560 km2, that include 5% of the ecoregion's area.

 Dehing Patkai Landscape, including Dehing Patkai National Park and Dehing Patkai Elephant Reserve
 Mehao Wildlife Sanctuary, Arunachal Pradesh  (190 km2, also includes portions of the Eastern Himalayan broadleaf forests and Himalayan subtropical pine forests)
 Manas National Park, Assam (560 km2)
 Bornadi Wildlife Sanctuary, Assam (90 km2)
 Kaziranga National Park, Assam (320 km2)
 Orang National Park, Assam (110 km2)
 Laokhowa Wildlife Sanctuary, Assam (170 km2)
 Pobitora Wildlife Sanctuary, Assam (80 km2)
 Sonai Rupai Wildlife Sanctuary, Assam (160 km2)
 Nameri National Park, Assam (90 km2)
 Dibru-Saikhowa National Park, Assam (490 km2)
 D'Ering Memorial Wildlife Sanctuary, Arunachal Pradesh (190 km2)
 Pabha Wildlife Sanctuary, Assam (110 km2)

Vulture breeding

Rani Vulture Breeding Centre was established in 2008 inside Brahmaputra Valley semi-evergreen forests at Rani in Kamprup district with the help of Jatayu Conservation Breeding Centre, Pinjore, which now houses 90 vultures as of December 2018. 40 million vultures have died in last 20 years.

See also
List of ecoregions in Bhutan
List of ecoregions in India

References

External links 

 Geographical ecoregion maps and basic info.

 
Tropical and subtropical moist broadleaf forests
Ecoregions of Bhutan
Ecoregions of India
Biota of Bhutan
Biota of India
Indomalayan ecoregions
Environment of Assam